Alexander Vyacheslavovich Ossovsky (July 31, 1957) was a renowned Russian musical writer, critic and musicologist, professor at Saint Petersburg Conservatory, pupil of Nikolai Rimsky-Korsakov, and friend of Sergei Rachmaninoff, Alexander Siloti and Nikolai Tcherepnin.

Biography
Alexander Ossovsky was born on March 31, 1871, in Kishinev, Bessarabia, Russian Empire into the family of Vyacheslav Stepanovich Ossovsky, who was a department chair in the Odessa Court; his mother was Yevgenia Cherkunova. The composer Mykola Vilinsky was his cousin. Ossovsky graduated from the Law School at Moscow University (1893).

After graduation he worked at the Ministry of Justice in Saint Petersburg. From 1896 to 1898 he studied at Saint Petersburg Conservatory. From 1900 to 1902 he studied composition with the composer Nikolai Rimsky-Korsakov. In 1894 Ossovsky started his career as a talented and prolific musical writer, musical critic and musicologist. Between 1915 and 1918 and 1921 to 1952, Ossovsky was a professor at the Saint Petersburg Conservatory (then Leningrad Conservatory), and in 1937 he became a deputy director there.

He was one of the founders of "Muzykal'nyi Sovremennik" ("Musical Contemporary") magazine in Saint Petersburg (1915–17). From 1923 to 1925 Ossovsky was the director, and from 1933 to 1936 the Art Chair, at the Leningrad Philharmonic. From 1943 to 1952 he was director at the Leningrad Music and Theater Research Institute. In 1931–33 he worked at the State Hermitage Museum in Leningrad.

Ossovsky maintained close ties with the composers of Belyayev's Circle and had become friend and colleague with a number of the members of Russian musical elite, including Sergei Rachmaninoff, Alexander Siloti and Alexander Glazunov. He contributed extensively to Siloti's concert programs as a writer, editor and critic.

In 1911 he helped Sergei Prokofiev publish his first works by writing a special letter in strong support of the composer to the Russian publisher P. Jurgenson. The same year, in Kiev, Rachmaninoff at the request of Ossovsky auditioned Ossovsky's cousin, Ksenia Derzhinskaia (1889–1951), and helped to launch her opera career; she became an eminent Russian singer and prima donna at the Bolshoi Theatre in Moscow. Ossovsky was a friend of the composer Nikolai Tcherepnin and mentored his son – also a famous composer, Alexander Tcherepnin – during the early years of his career.

Ossovsky died in 1957, in Leningrad, Soviet Union (now Saint Petersburg, Russia). He had written a series of papers and monographs dedicated to research and analysis of the works of such outstanding Russian composers as Mikhail Glinka, Glazunov, Rimsky-Korsakov and others. He was one of the first musicologists who introduced music of Bach, Rameau, Corelli, Vivaldi and Wagner to the Russian public. His memoir of Rachmaninoff is of special interest and value, because he gives first-hand accounts of, and insights into, many important events in the biographies of Rachmaninoff and other musicians. Ossovsky's works are frequently cited in many Western publications about Russian composers and their music.

Selected works (in Russian) 

Aleksandr Konstantinovich Glazunov: His life and creative work,  Alexander Siloti Concerts Publishing House, Sanct-Petersburg, 1907.
Mirovoe znachenie russkoi muzyki, (Worldwide significance of Russian classical music), Leningrad,. 1948.
N.A. Rimsky-Korsakov, in "Soviet Music" coll. of papers, book 3, Moscow. 1944.
Selected papers and memoirs. Leningrad, 1961
Muzikal'no-kriticheskie stat'ji (Musical and critic papers), Leningrad, 1971
Vospominaniia. Issledovaniia (Memoirs. Research). Leningrad, 1968.

References

External links 
 Works by Alexander Ossovsky 
 Alexander Ossovsky 
 Rimsky-Korsakov Saint-Petersburg State Conservatory. See History, Department of history of Foreign music 

1871 births
1957 deaths
Russian music theorists
Russian music critics
Russian writers
Russian memoirists
Russian musicologists
Corresponding Members of the USSR Academy of Sciences